Parliamentary Information and Communication Technology Service or PICT provides IT services to MPs, Peers and staff across the UK Parliament. It is the only department of Parliament jointly owned by both Houses.

References

External links 
 PICT recruitment site
 Oral evidence to procedure committee on E-Petitions refers to PICT
 Extracts from PICT business plan for 2007

Parliament of the United Kingdom